The Cello Concerto is a concerto for cello and orchestra by the American composer Stephen Albert.  The work was commissioned by the Baltimore Symphony Orchestra for the cellist Yo-Yo Ma.  It was given its world premiere by Yo-Yo Ma and the Baltimore Symphony Orchestra under the direction of David Zinman in Baltimore, May 1990.  It was one of Albert's last completed compositions before his death in December 1992.  The piece was later awarded the 1995 Grammy Award for Best Classical Contemporary Composition.

History 
According to David Grayson, "Albert composed the Cello Concerto between June 1989 and January 1990 and completed the orchestration by March. In the process, the work expanded considerably beyond its original project length". The work received its premiere on May 31, 1990, with Yo-Yo Ma as the soloist. (ibid)

Structure
The 1993 world premiere recording of Albert's Cello Concerto, performed by Yo-Yo Ma (Baltimore SO, cond. David Zinman) for the Sony Classical's The New York Album (1994), lasts for about 32'11". Accordingly, the Concerto is composed in four movements, with the following tempo and character designations:

I. Audacemente ma sostenuto, 6'38" 
II. Con brio – instante (urgent), 5'43" 
III. Larghetto, 9'50" 
IV. Con moto; con imminenzo e inquieto, 10'00"

Appreciation 
The cellist Yo-Yo Ma has stated about the work: "[Albert] puts [the themes] through all sorts of rhythmical and technical gyrations, and they emerge transformed, in a kind of catharsis. The Concerto, I believe, is an accurate mirror of what was going on in his life [in particular, his struggles with creative blocks and his response to the death of his father, to whose memory the concerto is dedicated]. In that sense, it is like one of the old romantic concertos — an autobiography of the wounded hero. This music is in the strongest sense personal and soulful, and it takes us through the same emotional journey Stephen was going through when he composed it. I love playing it, and I believe it will have a good life. It is playable, practical, rewarding, and its says something personal."

Reception
Andrew Clements of BBC Music Magazine praised the Cello Concerto as a "real novelty", remarking, "It is a beautifully wrought, coherent work, with some striking moments of dark introspection and a tragic cast that is truly impressive."  Gramophone called the work "a pretty riveting experience" and wrote:

References

Compositions by Stephen Albert
1990 compositions
Albert, Stephen
20th-century classical music
Music commissioned by the Baltimore Symphony Orchestra